Robert Dawes was an English actor.

Robert Dawes may also refer to:

Sir Robert Dawes (died 1690), second baronet of the Dawes baronets
Bob Dawes (1924–2003), Canadian ice hockey defenceman
Robert "Bobby" Dawes was a fictional candidate for Governor of Massachusetts in the tabletop roleplaying game Cyberpunk 2020

See also
Dawes (surname)